List of museums in Hamburg

The city of Hamburg, Germany is home to several museums, galleries, and other related cultural institutions. In 2009, 50 state and private museums, were located in Hamburg proper. This list contains the most famous or well-regarded organizations.

Museums 

Several foundations and organisations in Hamburg coordinate the events and exhibitions for most museums. Events like the Long Night of Museums (Lange Nacht der Museen) — during which the establishments remain open late into the night, seeking to introduce new individuals to the cultural institutions—are promoted by the Museumsdienst Hamburg. The ticket include only one fare for all museums and the public transport provided by the Hamburger Verkehrsverbund. In 2009, 42 museums and exhibition halls participated, with more than 600 events and exhibitions, and the cost was €12, reduced €8. More than 30,000 people attended.

Art

Music

History & Culture

Science & Natural History

Other

See also 
 List of castles in Hamburg
 List of churches in Hamburg
 List of libraries in Hamburg
 List of theatres in Hamburg

Notes

References 

General

 
 
Hamburg
Museums
Hamburg